Rockfield Studios is a residential recording studio located in the Wye Valley just outside the village of Rockfield, Monmouthshire, Wales.  It was originally founded in 1963 by brothers Kingsley and Charles Ward.

Facilities
Rockfield is a two-studio facility consisting of The Coach House and The Quadrangle. Both studios reside within converted solid-stone farm buildings. One of the world's first residential recording studios, Rockfield offers living accommodations for clients recording at the studio for an extended period of time.

The Coach House

Constructed in 1968, The Coach House includes a large 150-square-metre live area with stone walls, a wooden ceiling, and a Yamaha grand piano. In addition to the live room, there is one stone drum room, an acoustically variable second drum room, and two isolation booths. Recording equipment in The Coach House is based around a customised Neve 8121 recording console with vintage outboard processing, including Neve 1060 microphone amps, Rockfield's original Rosser Electronics microphone amps, API 550 equalisers and UREI 1176 compressors.

Artists who have recorded in The Coach House include Oasis, Bullet for My Valentine, Sepultura, Jayce Lewis, Simple Minds and Opeth.

The Quadrangle
Constructed in 1973, The Quadrangle offers a total of 170 square metres of recording space spread between the main area with Bösendorfer grand piano, two large variable acoustic drum rooms and three isolation booths. Recording equipment in The Quadrangle's 6m x 7m central control room is based around an MCI 500 Series in-line mixing console with outboard processing, including Neve 1061 microphone amps, Rockfield's original Rosser Electronics microphone amps, API 550 equalisers, and UREI 1176 compressors.

Best known for the recording of Queen's "Bohemian Rhapsody", The Quadrangle has hosted such notable artists as Manic Street Preachers, Robert Plant, Shop Front Heroes, and Coldplay.

History

Background and early history
The Ward family bought Amberley Court Farm in Rockfield in the early 1950s. Originally a Shire horse breeding centre, they ran it as a livestock farm, with 500 pigs and a herd of milking cows.

Brothers Kingsley and Charles Ward were educated at Abergavenny Grammar School. While there Charles got into the early rock and roll music of Elvis Presley and began playing an acoustic guitar that he purchased for £5. In 1960 the brothers formed a band named the Charles Kingsley Combo and Kingsley wrote a couple of songs, which the brothers recorded using a tape deck borrowed from a local businessman. Deciding to pursue a record deal, the brothers drove to EMI's pressing plant in Middlesex, London, but were redirected to the label's offices in Manchester Square where, on that same day without an appointment they met producer George Martin. Martin decided not to sign the brothers, but noted that the reason he was compelled to take the meeting was because they were the first artists he had seen bring a portable reel-to-reel tape deck.

The Ward brothers returned to London the following year and met with Joe Meek at his studio. Meek signed them, and the brothers recorded songs as The Charles Kingsley Creation and as The Thunderbolts while observing Meek's studio techniques. Back home, the brothers set up a recording studio in an attic space with a Rosser Electronics mixing console and a Ferrograph tape machine. In 1961 the brothers began recording local bands in their studio, which they named Future Sounds Ltd, charging £5 per acetate.

Early success

In 1963 the Ward brothers converted an existing farmhouse into a recording studio by investing in an 8-track tape deck and lining it with pig feed bags to create sound deadening. In 1965, they became the world's first residential studio, set up so that bands could come and stay in the peaceful rural surroundings to record.

The first big hit recorded in the studios was Dave Edmunds' "I Hear You Knocking" in 1970. In the early 1970s, the studios were used to record seven albums by Budgie, several by Hawkwind, one by Hobo, Peter Hammill's second solo album Chameleon in the Shadow of the Night in 1973, Ace's hit single "How Long" in 1974, and Queen's album Sheer Heart Attack. Queen first worked on developing their album A Night at the Opera and the song "Bohemian Rhapsody" for a month at Ridge Farm Studio during the summer of 1975, then moved to Rockfield in August 1975 to begin recording the album, which became the band's first Platinum-selling album in the US. Motörhead made their first recordings at the studios in 1975 and were, briefly, signed to the Rockfield record label. Cyril Jordan of the Flamin' Groovies (who recorded at Rockfield several times between 1972 and 1978) said in 2014, "We thought Rockfield was the new Sun recording studios."

Later developments
As the trend moved from rock music of the 1970s and 80's to the electronic music of the 1990s, which had a far greater use of technology and could almost be produced from a bedroom, the need for space and complex analogue recording systems reduced. Rockfield also faced more competition, with many of the main recording labels creating their own residential recording studios, such as Virgin's "The Manor". With the Rockfield company facing dire financial consequences, the Ward brothers decided to split the farm, with Kingsley retaining the Rockfield half, whilst Charles refurbished a semi-derelict manor house on the opposite side of the valley to create Monnow Valley Studio.

Facing financial difficulties, and with his wife Anne working full-time as a book keeper, Kingsley was approached by friend and record producer John Leckie to record the first album of Manchester band The Stone Roses. Resident for 14 months to record both their first and second albums, the band saved the studio financially. The band's residency created interest from other bands, resulting in recording sessions for other bands including Oasis.

During a 12-month period in 1996–97, Rockfield sessions resulted in five UK Number One albums, by Oasis, Black Grape, The Charlatans and the Boo Radleys.

In July 2020 the documentary Rockfield: The Studio on the Farm, directed by Hannah Berryman, was broadcast by BBC Four.

Charles Ward died on 27 July 2022.

Artist roster

1960s

Amen Corner
Doc Thomas Band (Mott the Hoople)
The Interns
Love Sculpture

1970s

Ace
Alquin
Joan Armatrading
Be-Bop Deluxe
Bintangs
Black Sabbath
Blonde on Blonde
Arthur Brown
Budgie
Rocky Burnette
Carlene Carter
City Boy
Dave Edmunds
Dr. Feelgood
Flamin' Groovies
Foghat
Peter Hammill
Roy Harper
Hawkwind
Help Yourself
Andy Irvine and Paul Brady
Judas Priest
Lone Star
Man
Barry Melton
Motörhead
Graham Parker & The Rumour
Mike Oldfield
Prelude
Queen
Radio Birdman
Rush
Shakin' Stevens and the Sunsets
Del Shannon
Gary Shearston
Edwin Starr
Solution
Tom Robinson Band
Tyla Gang
Van der Graaf Generator

1980s

Adam and the Ants
Age of Chance
Bad Manners
Alain Bashung
Bauhaus
Christian Death
Clannad
Tom Cochrane
Conflict
Cry Before Dawn
The Cult
The Damned
Di'Anno
Dumptruck
Echo & the Bunnymen
Edie Brickell & New Bohemians
Fields of the Nephilim
Ian Gillan
Human Drama
The Icicle Works
King Kurt
The Mighty Lemon Drops
Monsoon
Modern English
The Mood
Joey Parratt
Robert Plant
Iggy Pop
Simple Minds
Skids
Smashed Gladys
The Stone Roses
The Stranglers
The Teardrop Explodes
That Petrol Emotion
Thrashing Doves
T'Pau
The Undertones
The Waterboys
Danny Wilde
The Wonder Stuff

1990s

60 Ft. Dolls
Ash
Aztec Camera
The Beta Band
Big Country
Black Grape
Black Sabbath
The Bluetones
The Boo Radleys
Carcass
Cast
The Charlatans
Coldplay
Del Amitri
EMF
Energy Orchard
Gay Dad
Gene
Herbert Grönemeyer
Headswim
HIM
Hot House Flowers
Kerbdog
Julian Lennon
Annie Lennox
Lush
Manic Street Preachers
Menswear
Midget
Monk & Canatella
The Mutton Birds
Ned's Atomic Dustbin
Northside
Oasis
Paradise Lost
The Pogues
Sepultura
Stereophonics
The Stone Roses
Super Furry Animals
Symposium
Teenage Fanclub
Toploader
The Wedding Present
Paul Weller
Witness
XTC

2000s

Badly Drawn Boy
Band of Skulls
The Beta Band
Bullet for My Valentine
Catatonia
The Coral
The Darkness
Delays
Delphic
The Enemy
Funeral for a Friend
Gyroscope
Glamour of the Kill
Heaven & Hell
In Case of Fire
Kasabian
Nigel Kennedy
M83
Manic Street Preachers
George Michael
Morning Runner
New Order
Paolo Nutini
Ocean Colour Scene
Oceansize
The Proclaimers
Simple Minds
Starsailor
Joe Strummer
Suede
Super Furry Animals
Supergrass
KT Tunstall
Violent Soho
The Wombats

2010s/2020s

Bear's Den
Bellowhead
Emma Blackery
Broken Hands
Chinaski
The Darkness
Dinosaur Pile-Up
Frightened Rabbit
Frost*
Gun
Gwyneth Herbert
Idles
J.Fla
Kasabian
Jayce Lewis
Lower Than Atlantis
The Maccabees
Maxïmo Park
Merrymouth
Ben Montague
Nada Surf
Ocean Colour Scene
Opeth
Phantom Limb
Pixies
Palma Violets
The Proclaimers
Roving Crows
Royal Blood
Savage Messiah
Shadow Academy
The Sherlocks
Skinny Lister
The Strypes
Turbowolf
Turin Brakes
The Treatment
Shame

References

External links
 
 – Official website
 

Buildings and structures in Monmouthshire
Recording studios in Wales
Companies of Wales